KRVF ( FM) is a country music radio station licensed to Kerens, Texas and is owned and operated by LKCM Radio Group.

KRVF is a sister station to 95.9 KFWR-FM "The Ranch" in Jacksboro, Texas and serves as an affiliate of the Dallas Cowboys radio network.

History
On August 16, 1979, 107.1 signed on as KTLR, licensed to Terrell, Texas and was owned by Ken Jones d.b.a. Terrell Radio. It signed on as the FM counterpart to 1570 KTER. KTLR later moved to the Corsicana area, licensed to Kerens, as part of a series of moves that also included former sister station 107.1 KRVA-FM relocating from McKinney to Sulphur Springs.

On New Year's Day 1993, KTLR to 106.9 and changed to a Spanish music format from Spanish Radio pioneer Marcos Rodriguez Sr., son of Marcos A. Rodriguez. In 1997, the call letters were changed to KZDL under the same format. In 1999, the callsign was changed to KRVF and included a simulcast of WFAA-TV's evening news in Spanish. In 2003, the station was bought by LKCM from First Broadcasting. The format changed to Texas/Red Dirt music. It is currently co-owned with KFWR The Ranch in Ft. Worth, Texas and KTFW in Glen Rose, Texas.  KRVF simulcast over 107.1 KRVA in Sulphur Springs, Texas until LKCM sold 107.1 to The Way Media Group. KRVA now airs a separate country format for Sulphur Springs.

References

External links
106.9 KRVF official website

 DFW Radio/TV History

Country radio stations in the United States
RVF